Oxford Park railway station is located on the Ferny Grove line in Brisbane, Queensland, Australia.  It is one of two railway stations serving the Brisbane suburb of Mitchelton, the other being Mitchelton railway station.

History
The station was upgraded in 2008 as part of the Mitchelton to Keperra duplication project.

Services
Oxford Park station is served by all stops Ferny Grove line services from Ferny Grove to Roma Street, Park Road, Coopers Plains and Beenleigh.

Services by platform

References

External links

Oxford Park station Queensland Rail
Oxford Park station Queensland's Railways on the Internet
[ Oxford Park station] TransLink travel information

Mitchelton, Queensland
Railway stations in Brisbane